This is a list of both legislative assemblies of the Utah Territory and the legislatures of Utah since statehood in 1896.

Utah Territorial Legislature

1st - 10th Utah Legislative Assemblies

 1st Utah Territorial Legislature: September 22, 1851 to February 18, 1852
 2nd Utah Territorial Legislature: December 13, 1852 to January 21, 1853 
3rd Utah Territorial Legislature: 1853 — 1854
5th Utah Territorial Legislature: 1855 — 1856
6th Utah Territorial Legislature: 1856 — 1857
7th Utah Territorial Legislature: 1857 — 1858
8th Utah Territorial Legislature: 1858 — 1859
9th Utah Territorial Legislature: 1859 — 1860
10th Utah Territorial Legislature: 1860 — 1861

11th - 20th Utah Legislative Assemblies

11th Utah Territorial Legislature: 1861 — 1862
12th Utah Territorial Legislature: 1862 — 1863
13th Utah Territorial Legislature: 1863 — 1864
14th Utah Territorial Legislature: 1864 — 1865
16th Utah Territorial Legislature: 1866 — 1867
17th Utah Territorial Legislature: January 13, 1868
18th Utah Territorial Legislature: January 11, 1869
19th Utah Territorial Legislature: January 10, 1870
20th Utah Territorial Legislature: January 8, 1872

21st - 31st Utah Legislative Assemblies

21st Utah Territorial Legislature: January 12, 1874
22nd Utah Territorial Legislature: January 10, 1876
23rd Utah Territorial Legislature: January 14, 1878
24th Utah Territorial Legislature: January 12, 1880
25th Utah Territorial Legislature: January 9, 1882
26th Utah Territorial Legislature: January 14, 1884
27th Utah Territorial Legislature: January 11, 1886
28th Utah Territorial Legislature: January 9, 1888
29th Utah Territorial Legislature: January 13, 1890
30th Utah Territorial Legislature: January 11, 1892
31st Utah Territorial Legislature: January 8, 1894

Utah State Legislatures

1st - 10th Utah State Legislatures

1st Utah State Legislature: January 13, 1896 — January 10, 1897
2nd Utah State Legislature: January 11, 1897 — January 8, 1899
3rd Utah State Legislature: January 9, 1899 — January 13, 1901
4th Utah State Legislature: January 14, 1901 — January 11, 1903 
5th Utah State Legislature: January 12, 1903 — January 8, 1905
6th Utah State Legislature: January 9, 1905 — January 13, 1907
7th Utah State Legislature: January 14, 1907 — January 10, 1909
8th Utah State Legislature: January 11, 1909 — January 8, 1911
9th Utah State Legislature: January 9, 1911 — January 12, 1913
10th Utah State Legislature: January 13, 1913 — January 10, 1915

11th - 20th Utah State Legislatures

11th Utah State Legislature: January 11, 1915 — January 7, 1917
12th Utah State Legislature: January 8, 1917 — January 12, 1919
13th Utah State Legislature: January 13, 1919 — January 9, 1921
14th Utah State Legislature: January 10, 1921 — January 7, 1923
15th Utah State Legislature: January 8, 1923 — January 11, 1925
16th Utah State Legislature: January 12, 1925 — January 9, 1927
17th Utah State Legislature: January 10, 1927 — January 13, 1929
18th Utah State Legislature: January 14, 1929 — January 11, 1931
19th Utah State Legislature: January 12, 1931 — January 8, 1933
20th Utah State Legislature: January 9, 1933 — January 13, 1935

21st - 30th Utah State Legislatures

21st Utah State Legislature: January 14, 1935 — January 10, 1937
22nd Utah State Legislature: January 11, 1937 — January 8, 1939
23rd Utah State Legislature: January 9, 1939 — January 12, 1941
24th Utah State Legislature: January 13, 1941 — January 10, 1943
25th Utah State Legislature: January 11, 1943 — January 7, 1945
26th Utah State Legislature: January 8, 1945 — January 12, 1947
27th Utah State Legislature: January 13, 1947 — January 9, 1949
28th Utah State Legislature: January 10, 1949 — January 7, 1951
29th Utah State Legislature: January 8, 1951 — January 11, 1953
30th Utah State Legislature: January 12, 1953 — January 9, 1955

31st - 40th Utah State Legislatures

31st Utah State Legislature: January 10, 1955 — January 13, 1957
32nd Utah State Legislature: January 14, 1957 — January 11, 1959
33rd Utah State Legislature: January 12, 1959 — January 8, 1961
34th Utah State Legislature: January 9, 1961 — January 13, 1963
35th Utah State Legislature: January 14, 1963 — January 10, 1965
36th Utah State Legislature: January 11, 1965 — January 8, 1967
37th Utah State Legislature: January 9, 1967 — January 12, 1969
38th Utah State Legislature: January 13, 1969 — January 10, 1971
39th Utah State Legislature: January 11, 1971 — January 7, 1973
40th Utah State Legislature: January 8, 1973 — January 12, 1975

41st - 50th Utah State Legislatures

41st Utah State Legislature: January 13, 1975 — January 9, 1977
42nd Utah State Legislature: January 10, 1977 — January 7, 1979
43rd Utah State Legislature: January 8, 1979 — January 11, 1981
44th Utah State Legislature: January 12, 1981 — January 9, 1983
45th Utah State Legislature: January 10, 1983 — January 13, 1985
46th Utah State Legislature: January 14, 1985 — January 11, 1987
47th Utah State Legislature: January 12, 1987 — January 8, 1989
48th Utah State Legislature: January 9, 1989 — January 13, 1991
49th Utah State Legislature: January 14, 1991 — January 17, 1993
50th Utah State Legislature: January 18, 1993 — January 15, 1995

51st - 60th Utah State Legislatures

51st Utah State Legislature: January 16, 1995 — January 19, 1997
52nd Utah State Legislature: January 20, 1997 — January 17, 1999
53rd Utah State Legislature: January 18, 1999 — January 14, 2001
54th Utah State Legislature: January 15, 2001 — January 19, 2003
55th Utah State Legislature: January 20, 2003 — January 16, 2005
56th Utah State Legislature: January 17, 2005 — January 14, 2007
57th Utah State Legislature: January 15, 2007 — January 20, 2009
58th Utah State Legislature: January 26, 2009 — January 23, 2011
 2010:  January 25-March 11, 2010 
59th Utah State Legislature: January 24, 2011 — January 27, 2013
 2011: January 24-March 10, July 27, October 3, 2011 
 2012: January 23-March 8, 2012 
60th Utah State Legislature: January 28, 2013 — January 25, 2015
 2013: January 28-March 14, 2013 
 2014: January 27-March 14, 2014

61st - 70th Utah State Legislatures 
61st Utah State Legislature: January 26, 2015 — January 22, 2017
 2015: January 26-March 12, August 19, 2015 
 2016: January 25-March 10, May 18, 2016 
62nd Utah State Legislature: January 23, 2017 — January 28, 2019
 2017: January 23-March 9, September 20, 2017 
 2018: January 22-March 8, 2018 
 63rd Utah State Legislature January 28, 2019 - January 19, 2021
 2019: January 28-March 14, 2019 
 2020: January 27-March 12, 2020  
 64th Utah State Legislature January 19, 2021 -
 2021: January 19-March 5, 2021 
 2022: January 18-March 4, 2022 
 65th Utah State Legislature

See also
 List of governors of Utah
 History of Utah

References

External links
Utah State Legislature Publications
 Utah State Legislature. Legislative History Resources
 
 

Legislatures
Legislature
 
Utah